HMS Tower was a modified  destroyer of the Royal Navy, named after the White Tower of the Tower of London. She was built by Swan Hunter, and launched on 5 April 1917. She is noted for having the first modern Royal Navy ship's badge. She served as part of the Grand Fleet and Harwich Force.

She held the pennant number of F24 from January 1918 until she was sold in 1928.

Ship's badge
Prior to 1917 there was no standard design for a ship's badge.  The first modern ship's badge was designed by Mr George Richardson; Director of the Swan Hunter shipyard on the Tees; and Major Charles ffoulkes; the curator of the government endorsed museum for the collection of artefacts of war.

The Commanding Officer of Tower asked Richardson if he could offer a design for the badge for his ship.  Richardson spoke to ffoulkes and together they came up with a design that showed the White Tower of the Tower of London, with the motto "God save King George and his Tower".  This was encased in a circular rope frame, with a Naval Crown at the top, along with the name "Tower" set into a rectangular panel at the bottom.  This design set the standard for all future ship's badges and became the design from which all today's badges are derived.  Major ffoulkes was subsequently requested to design others and the Admiralty Board set up a Ships' Badges Committee in 1918 to regulate ships' badges with him as the first Adviser on Heraldry.

Tower was sold for scrap on 17 May 1928 and subsequently broken up by John Cashmore Ltd at Newport.

Notes

Bibliography
 
 
 
 

 

R-class destroyers (1916)
World War I destroyers of the United Kingdom
1917 ships
Ships built by Swan Hunter